Shimotori is a Japanese surname. People with this surname include:
, Japanese freestyle wrestler
, Japanese sumo wrestler

References

Japanese-language surnames